VfL Marburg is the oldest sports club of the Universitätsstadt Marburg, Germany, having been established in 1860 as a gymnastics club.

Sporting spectrum 
VfL Marburg has 12 different sporting departments, in gymnastics, hockey, volleyball, lacrosse, handball, table tennis, badminton, fencing, swimming, athletics, fitness and music.

Football 
From 1937, VfB Marburg belonged to the sports club, until separating in 1992 and reclaiming its historical identity as the Verein für Bewegungsspiele 1905 Marburg e.V.

External links 
 VfL Marburg 

Marburg
Sports clubs established in 1860
Athletics clubs in Germany
Defunct football clubs in Hesse
Field hockey clubs in Germany
German handball clubs
German volleyball clubs
1860 establishments in Germany
Football clubs in Germany
Multi-sport clubs in Germany